The Phalgu or Falgu, a river that flows past Gaya, India in the Indian state of Bihar, is a sacred river for Hindus and Buddhists. Lord Vishnu's Temple Vishnupad Mandir is situated on the bank of Phalgu river also called Niranjana river.

Course

The Phalgu is also mentioned as Niranjan. The Phalgu here passes by a high rocky bank, on the steep sides of which are many paved stairs leading down to the river bed, while high above are the Vishnupad Mandir, with many minor shrines around it.

The Phalgu like its confluent streams, Lilajan and Mohana, is subject to high floods during the monsoons but in other seasons of the year it dwindles to a stream wandering through a wide expanse of sand.

Religious significance

History

The portion of the course of the Phalgu flowing by Gaya is sacred to the Hindus. It is the first holy site visited by the pilgrim and here his first offering must be made for the souls of his ancestors. According to the Gaya Mahatmya, which forms part of the Vayu Purana, the Phalgu is the embodiment of Vishnu himself. One tradition states that it formerly flowed with milk.

According to Hindu belief, the soul wanders after death until pindadan, or religious service seeking salvation for the dead from the cycle of rebirth, is performed. The fortnight-long pitrapaksh period is considered auspicious to offer pindadan. The 15 days of the waning moon during the Hindu month of Ashvin are known as pitrapaksh. Pindadan is traditionally offered on the banks of the Phalgu at Gaya. It is mandatory for Hindu devotees offering pindadan to shave their heads and take a holy dip and head for the Baitarni pond. The prayers are performed at the Vishnupad Mandir. Priests, known as Gaywal-pandas, conduct the ritual. Thousands of Hindus visit Gaya for the purpose of pindadan.

Hinduism
There is reference to the city of Gaya and the Phalgu in the Ramayana in which it says that Sita had cursed the Phalgu River. There is an interesting story and the purana states that on account of this curse, the Phalgu lost its water, and the river is simply a vast stretch of sand dunes. According to mythology, in the absence of Rama, his wife Sita offered pinda on its banks to Dasharatha father of Rama.

The story goes that Rama, along with his brothers and Sita, came to Gaya to perform the sacred rites for his father, Dasaratha. When the brothers were bathing in the river, Sita was sitting on the banks, playing with the sand. Suddenly, Dasaratha appeared out of the sand, and asked for the Pindam, saying he was hungry. Sita asked him to wait till his sons returned, so that she could give him the traditional Pindam of rice and til. He refused to wait, asking her to give him pindams made of the sand in his hand.

Having no other option, in the presence of five witnesses – the Akshaya Vatam, the Falguni River, a cow, a Tulsi plant and a Brahmin, she gave him the Pindam he desired.  Soon, Rama returned and started the rituals. In those days apparently, the ancestors would arrive in person to collect their share, and when Dasaratha did not appear, they wondered why. Sita then told them what had happened, but Rama could not believe that his father would accept pindams made of sand. Sita now mentioned her witnesses, and asked them to tell Rama the truth.

Among the five, only the Akshaya Vatam took her side and told the truth, while the others lied, trying to take Rama’s side. In her anger, Sita cursed all of them thus: the Falguni river henceforth would have no water at Gaya; the Cow would no longer be worshipped from the front as all others are- only its backside would be worshipped; there would be no more Tulsi plants at Gaya and the Gaya Brahmins would never be satisfied, they would always be hungry and crave more and more. She then blessed the Akshaya Vatam saying that all who came to Gaya would perform the Pinda pradaanam at the Akshaya Vatam too.

Buddhism
Before attaining Enlightenment, the prince Siddhārtha Gautama practiced asceticism for six years (ten or twelve years according to some accounts) on the banks of the river, residing in a forest near the village of Uruvilvā. After realizing that strict asceticism would not lead to Enlightenment, he recuperated after bathing in the river and receiving a bowl of milk-rice from the milkmaid Sujātā.

He sat under the nearby pippala tree, where he finally achieved Enlightenment. This tree became known as the Bodhi Tree, and the site became known as Bodh Gayā.

References

Rivers of Bihar
Rivers in Buddhism
Rivers of India